James J. Martin (1905 – 3 October 1969) was an Irish Fianna Fáil politician. He was a member of Seanad Éireann from 1965 to 1969. He was elected to the 11th Seanad in 1965 by the Agricultural Panel. He was re-elected at the 1969 Seanad election but died in office in October 1969.

He had stood unsuccessfully for Dáil Éireann as a Fianna Fáil candidate for the Laois–Offaly constituency at the 1957, 1961 and 1965 general elections.

References

1905 births
1969 deaths
Fianna Fáil senators
Irish farmers
Members of the 11th Seanad
Members of the 12th Seanad
People from County Clare